William Botsford Troop (April 13, 1824 – c. 1905) was a merchant, ship owner and political figure in Nova Scotia. He represented Annapolis County in the Nova Scotia House of Assembly from 1874 to 1882 as a Conservative member.

He was born in Granville, Nova Scotia, the son of Israel Troop and a descendant of Amos Botsford. In 1872, Troop married Elizabeth Ann Magee. He was named to the province's Executive Council in 1878.

References 
The Canadian parliamentary companion and annual register, 1882, CH Mackintosh

1834 births
1904 deaths
Progressive Conservative Association of Nova Scotia MLAs
People from Annapolis County, Nova Scotia